Bekanamycin (INN, or kanamycin B) is an aminoglycoside antibiotic.

References 

Aminoglycoside antibiotics